Christmas from the Heart may refer to:

 Christmas from the Heart (David Archuleta album), a 2009 album
 Christmas from the Heart (Kenny Rogers album), a 1998 album

See also
 Christmas in the Heart, a 2009 album by Bob Dylan